Harold Frank Murray was an Australian lawn bowls international who competed in the 1938 British Empire Games.

Bowls career
He bowled for the Hamilton Bowls Club, New South Wales.

At the 1938 British Empire Games he won the bronze medal in the rinks (fours) event with Aub Murray, Charlie McNeill and Tom Kinder.

He was the 1938 Australian National Bowls Championships rinks (fours) winner when bowling with McNeill, Murray and Kinder. In addition Harold Murray won the 1934 national rinks title.

The fours team were known as the Big Four in Australia because they also won four state titles.

References

Australian male bowls players
Bowls players at the 1938 British Empire Games
Commonwealth Games bronze medallists for Australia
Commonwealth Games medallists in lawn bowls
20th-century Australian people
Medallists at the 1938 British Empire Games